Lipstick is the debut studio album by South Korea girl group After School sub-unit Orange Caramel. It was released on September 12, 2012 and contains 13 songs (including a new recording of their song "Bangkok City".) The title track "Lipstick" samples the popular tune "The Streets of Cairo" and was used as the album's lead single. The album includes previous hits such as "Magic Girl", "A-ing" and "Shanghai Romance" and each member also has their own solo song.

Background
Early May 2012, Pledis Entertainment's managing director announced that Orange Caramel will be releasing their first full-length album later that year and that the album demo is "nearly finalized". Several months later, in September, Pledis revealed three photo teasers through their official Twitter page of each member. The following day, the track list was revealed and a special teaser was released on September 7, 2012. Two days later, another three individual member photo teasers were revealed through Pledis's Twitter page and a music video teaser was posted the following day, with the final music video being released at 12PM Kst on September 12, 2012 along with the album being released through Korean online music stores and iTunes worldwide.

Promotion
Promotion for "Lipstick" began on Mnet's M! Countdown on September 13, 2012 and they also performed a shortened version of "Milkshake" as a part of their special comeback stage. Orange Caramel continued to promote the song on various Korean music shows such as Music Bank, Music Core, Inkigayo and Show Champion.

Chart performance
The title track, "Lipstick", was a commercial success having managed to stay in the Top 10 singles on the Gaon Digital Chart and Korea K-Pop Hot 100 for over a month. To date, the title track has been downloaded more than one million times in South Korea according to the Gaon Download Chart. The album itself charted well, peaking at number 3 on the Gaon Weekly Album Chart, number 9 on the Gaon Monthly Album Chart and it also charted on Japan's Oricon Weekly Album chart at number 92, selling 2,187 copies.

Track listing

Charts

Album charts

Sales

Release history

References

External links
 After School Official Website 

2012 debut albums
Korean-language albums
Kakao M albums
Orange Caramel albums